Todd Glacier is a glacier 7 nautical miles (13 km) long flowing southwest into Calmette Bay, western Graham Land. Photographed from the air by Ronne Antarctic Research Expedition (RARE), 1947. Surveyed by British Antarctic Survey (BAS), 1961–62. Named by United Kingdom Antarctic Place-Names Committee (UK-APC) for Gertrude E. Todd, BAS Scientific Officer and Editor, employed in the London Office, 1950–63.

Glaciers of Fallières Coast